John David Dunlop (born September 18, 1965 in Ottawa, Ontario) is a Canadian guitarist, composer, producer, recording engineer, and vocalist. Dunlop was a member, writer, guitarist, and back-up singer in Canadian rock band The Full Nine (Disney's Mammoth Records). Since 1996, he has had a successful musical relationship with Rik Emmett, sharing guitar-playing duties in The Rik Emmett Band, Strung-Out Troubadours, and Triumph.

In 2007, Strung-Out Troubadours won "Album of the Year" and "Group/Duo Of The Year" at the Canadian Smooth Jazz Awards, where they were the most heavily nominated act.  Both Dunlop and his partner Rik Emmett were also nominated for "Best Guitarist"].

He has been an integral member of Jeans 'n Classics since 2005, travelling around North America playing Pop and Rock shows with orchestras playing the music of Pink Floyd, The Beatles, Jeff Beck, Eric Clapton, and others.

Dave recently co-produced, co-engineered and co-mixed the upcoming (Nov 11 '16) Mascot Records release "Rik Emmett & RESolution9" (Res9), working with Alex Lifeson of Rush, James LaBrie of Dream Theater, and Triumph members Gil Moore and Mike Levine.

On October 18, 2016 Dave released his long-awaited full-length album called "Monarch Girl". Guests on the record include Rik Emmett, Randy Cooke, David Blamires, Paul DeLong, and Don Breithaupt.

Dunlop also owns & operates "Room 9" recording studio in Toronto, Ontario, Canada.

Discography

Albums

 1998 Insulin - Insulin
 2002 The Full Nine - The Full Nine
 2004 Dead Wait - The Full Nine
 2006 Strung-Out Troubadours - Strung-Out Troubadours (with Rik Emmett)
 2006 Live at Hugh's Room - Strung-Out Troubadours (with Rik Emmett)
 2009 Push & Pull - Strung-Out Troubadours (with Rik Emmett)
 2011 ReCovery Room 9 - Strung-Out Troubadours (with Rik Emmett)
 2012 Then Again: Songs from the Triumph Catalogue - Rik Emmett (produced/recorded by Dave)
 2015 " Best of the Troubs" - Rik Emmett & Dave Dunlop
 2016 "RESolution9"- Rik Emmett (Producer)
 2016 "Monarch Girl" - Dave Dunlop

References

External links
 Official Dave Dunlop Website
 Official Strung-Out Troubadours Website
 "Full Nine" review.

1965 births
Living people
Canadian rock guitarists
Canadian male guitarists
Canadian songwriters
Canadian rock singers
Canadian male singers
Musicians from Ottawa
Writers from Ottawa